The 1914 Toronto Argonauts season was the 31st season for the team since the franchise's inception in 1873. The team finished in second place in the Interprovincial Rugby Football Union with a 5–1 record after losing the season series to the Hamilton Tigers, who finished in first place with the same record. The Argonauts would play the Tigers in a two-game playoff series and after tying the first game, they would win the second, becoming the IRFU champions. After defeating the Hamilton Rowing Club in the Eastern Final, the Argonauts advanced to the 6th Grey Cup, which was their third appearance in the championship game in four years. The Argonauts won their first national championship in franchise history over the Toronto Varsity Blues by a score of 14-2. They became the first team to win the Grey Cup after finishing second in their union, after all previous winners had finished first in their respective leagues.

Regular season

Standings

Schedule

Postseason

Grey Cup

December 5 @ Varsity Stadium (Attendance: 10,500)

References

Toronto Argonauts seasons
Grey Cup championship seasons
1914 in Canadian football